Éric Brisson (born 8 December 1973) is a Canadian speed skater. He competed in the men's 500 metres event at the 2002 Winter Olympics.

References

1973 births
Living people
Canadian male speed skaters
Olympic speed skaters of Canada
Speed skaters at the 2002 Winter Olympics
Sportspeople from Quebec
People from Longueuil (agglomeration)
21st-century Canadian people